Claudius Amyand may refer to:

 Claudius Amyand (surgeon) (c. 1660–1740), Huguenot surgeon
 Claudius Amyand (MP) (1718–1774), MP for Tregony and Sandwich, son of above